Patrick Donoghue (13 November 1891 – 18 September 1967) was an Irish hurler who played as a left wing-forward for the Kilkenny senior team.

Hackett made his first appearance for the team during the 1917 championship and was a regular member of the starting fifteen until his retirement after the 1924 championship. During that time, he won one All-Ireland medal and two Leinster medals.

At club level, Hackett was a two-time county club championship medalist with Dicksboro.

References

1891 births
1967 deaths
Dicksboro hurlers
Kilkenny inter-county hurlers
All-Ireland Senior Hurling Championship winners